Villers-lès-Roye (literally Villers near Roye) is a commune in the Somme department in Hauts-de-France in northern France.

Geography
The commune is situated 25 miles(40 km) southeast of Amiens, on the D54 road.

Population

See also
Communes of the Somme department

References

Communes of Somme (department)